Valcemar Justino da Silva (born February 27, 1968) is a Brazilian professional racing cyclist for the Supermecados Sales-Pinarello-BH team.

Career highlights

2008 – Sales Supermercados-Pinarello-BH
  National Championship, Road, Elite, Brazil (BRA)
2006 – Scott–Marcondes Cesar–São José dos Campos
 1st overall GC – Volta Internacional de Porto Alegre (BRA)
2002 – Pedal Bike Shop-São José dos Campos
 1st overall GC – Volta Internacional de Porto Alegre (BRA)
1996 –
 1st overall GC – Volta Internacional de Porto Alegre (BRA)

External links

1968 births
Living people
Brazilian male cyclists
Brazilian road racing cyclists
Place of birth missing (living people)